"Holy Virgin" is the first single from the album 21st Century by German trance group Groove Coverage. It is based on the song Fata Morgana by EAV.

Remix list

"Holy Virgin" (Radio Edit) – 3:50
"Holy Virgin" (Pop Edit) – 3:28
"Holy Virgin" (Extended Mix) – 5:44
"Holy Virgin" (Club Mix) – 5:36
"Holy Virgin" (Rob Mayth Remix) – 5:47
"Holy Virgin" (Tekhouse Mix) – 6:23
"Holy Virgin" (Vinylshakers Mix) – 5:25

Chart positions

References

Groove Coverage songs
2005 songs
Song articles with missing songwriters